Ateliers et Chantiers de Bretagne was a French shipbuilding company of the late 19th and early 20th century, renamed from Établissement de la Brosse et Fouché in 1909. The shipyard often built destroyers for the French Navy.

References

Shipyards of France